

Ælfwine was a medieval Bishop of Elmham.

Ælfwine was consecrated before 1019 and died on 12 April between 1023 and 1038.

References

External links
 

Bishops of Elmham
1023 deaths
Year of birth unknown